Justin Rory Gonzales (born c. 1982) is an employee of a logging company in Okolona, Arkansas, who is a Republican member of the Arkansas House of Representatives for District 19, which encompasses Clark, Pike, Howard, and Hempstead counties in the southwestern portion of his state.

In 2014, he was elected to succeed Democrat Nate Steel, who ran unsuccessfully for state attorney general against Leslie Rutledge in a general Republican sweep of Arkansas elections. In his first term in office, Gonzales sits on the committees of (1) Revenue and Taxation, (2) County, City and Local Affairs, and (3) the Joint Committee on Advanced Communication and Information Technology.

Gonzales graduated c. 2000 from Gurdon High School in Gurdon in Clark County. He is a member of the board of his local Church of God denomination and is president of youth baseball and softball teams in Gurdon. He serves on the Okolona Volunteer Fire Department. He and his wife, Cassie, have two children.

In February 2015, Gonzales joined dozens of his fellow Republicans and two Democrats in co-sponsoring legislation submitted by Representative Lane Jean of Magnolia, to reduce unemployment compensation benefits. The measure was promptly signed into law by Republican Governor Asa Hutchinson.

References

1982 births
Living people
Republican Party members of the Arkansas House of Representatives
American politicians of Mexican descent
People from Clark County, Arkansas
Gurdon High School alumni
21st-century American politicians